This is a list of earthquakes in 2016. Only earthquakes of magnitude 6 or above are included, unless they result in damage and/or casualties, or are notable for some other reason.  All dates are listed according to UTC time. Maximum intensities are indicated on the Mercalli intensity scale and are sourced from United States Geological Survey (USGS) ShakeMap data. Major events took place in Ecuador, Italy, Taiwan, Indonesia and New Zealand this year, while the strongest tremor was observed in Papua New Guinea. 2016 was also the first year since 2002 with no magnitude 8+ earthquakes.

Compared to other years

An increase in detected earthquake numbers does not necessarily represent an increase in earthquakes per se. Population increase, habitation spread, and advances in earthquake detection technology all contribute to higher earthquake numbers being recorded over time.

By death toll

Listed are earthquakes with at least 10 dead.

By magnitude

Listed are earthquakes with at least 7.0 magnitude.

By month

January

The shock had a maximum intensity of I (Not felt).
The shock had a maximum intensity of VII (Very strong). At least 11 people were killed (six in India and five in Bangladesh), 200 others were injured and a large number of buildings were damaged.
The shock had a maximum intensity of I (Not felt).
The shock had a maximum intensity of VI (Strong).
The shock had a maximum intensity of IV (Light).
The shock had a maximum intensity of II (Weak).
The shock had a maximum intensity of VI (Strong).
The shock had a maximum intensity of VII (Very strong). One person died, 19 were injured and about 120 houses were damaged in two villages on Ambelau island.
The shock had a maximum intensity of VII (Very strong). Nine people were injured and 600 houses were damaged.
The shock had a maximum intensity of IV (Light).
The shock had a maximum intensity of VII (Very strong). Four homes were destroyed in Kenai after a gas leak.
About 100 students sustained minor injuries and there were power outages in Awasa.
The shock had a maximum intensity of VI (Strong). An 8-year-old child died, fifteen were injured and some buildings were damaged; it also caused a blackout in the region.
The shock had a maximum intensity of IV (Light).
The shock had a maximum intensity of VII (Very strong).
The shock had a maximum intensity of I (Not felt).

February

The shock had a maximum intensity of III (Weak).
The shock had a maximum intensity of IV (Light). 66 people were injured in Nepal during this earthquake, while one person died of a heart attack in Muzaffarpur, India.
The shock had a maximum intensity of VII (Very strong). Numerous buildings, including a residential tower, collapsed in Yongkang district. 117 people were killed and 550 were injured.
The shock had a maximum intensity of V (Moderate).
The shock had a maximum intensity of V (Moderate). Several people were injured and some damage was caused to private houses and schools.
The shock had a maximum intensity of VI (Strong).
The shock had a maximum intensity of VI (Strong).
The shock had a maximum intensity of VIII (Severe). Minor damage was reported and parts of the region suffered from liquefaction. A part of Godley Head collapsed and other cliffs collapsed as well.
The shock had a maximum intensity of VI (Strong).
The shock had a maximum intensity of V (Moderate). Dozens of buildings were damaged in Krestena mostly in the form of cracks on walls.
The shock had a maximum intensity of I (Not felt).
The shock had a maximum intensity of VI (Strong).
The shock had a maximum intensity of IV (Light). Three people were injured, 24 houses were destroyed and 104 others were damaged. A road was also blocked by a landslide.
The shock had a maximum intensity of IV (Light). One person was injured while fleeing his home due to panic.
The shock had a maximum intensity of IV (Light). This was an aftershock of the 6.3 quake.
The shock had a maximum intensity of III (Weak). A total of 113 buildings were damaged, some of them severely.
The shock had a maximum intensity of I (Not felt).

March

The shock had a maximum intensity of III (Weak).
The shock had a maximum intensity of IV (Light).
The shock had a maximum intensity of IV (Light). This was an aftershock of the 6.3 quake.
The shock had a maximum intensity of IV (Light).
The shock had a maximum intensity of IV (Light).

April

The shock had a maximum intensity of V (Moderate).
The shock had a maximum intensity of VII (Very strong).
The shock had a maximum intensity of VI (Strong).
The shock had a maximum intensity of VI (Strong). This was an aftershock of the 6.9 quake.
The shock had a maximum intensity of IV (Light).
The shock had a maximum intensity of V (Moderate). This was an aftershock of the 6.9 quake.
At least three people were injured.
The shock had a maximum intensity of IV (Light). Ten people were killed and 46 injured in Pakistan.
The shock had a maximum intensity of VI (Strong). 2 people were killed and 70 injured in Assam, India. 50 people were hurt in Chittagong, Bangladesh.
The shock had a maximum intensity of VII (Very strong). Three people were injured when a wall fell on them and five homes collapsed.
The shock had a maximum intensity of VII (Very strong). Nine people were killed, while more than 800 others were injured. At least 20 homes and a wall of the Kumamoto Castle collapsed, while more than 24,000 people were forced to spend several nights in shelters. This was a foreshock of the 7.0 quake.
The shock had a maximum intensity of VII (Very strong). This was a foreshock of the 7.0 quake.
The shock had a maximum intensity of VI (Strong). This was an aftershock of the 6.9 quake.
The shock had a maximum intensity of IV (Light).
The shock had a maximum intensity of X (Extreme). A total of 273 people were killed and more than 1,000 others were injured, many of which were indirect. 8,700 buildings were damaged and a bridge collapsed in Aso, Kumamoto Prefecture.
The shock had a maximum intensity of IX (Violent).  668 people were killed, 8 missing and over 6,200 injured. 7,000 buildings were destroyed or damaged.
The shock had a maximum intensity of IV (Light).
The shock had a maximum intensity of VI (Strong). This was an aftershock of the 7.8 quake.
The shock had a maximum intensity of VII (Very strong). This was an aftershock of the 7.8 quake.
The shock had a maximum intensity of VII (Very strong). This was an aftershock of the 7.8 quake.
The shock had a maximum intensity of IV (Light).
The shock had a maximum intensity of IV (Light).
The shock had a maximum intensity of IV (Light). The quake caused slight damage in La Rochelle.
The shock had a maximum intensity of VII (Very strong). Items were knocked off shelves and power was cut in Luganville. 
The shock had a maximum intensity of I (Not felt).

May

The shock had a maximum intensity of VI (Strong). Sixty people were reported injured, six seriously; with collapsed houses and bridges and roads damaged due to landslides.
The shock had a maximum intensity of IV (Light). One person was injured and minor damage to buildings occurred in Guadalajara and Zapotlan.
The shock had a maximum intensity of VII (Very strong). Power cuts were reported near the epicenter. This was an aftershock of the 7.8 quake in April.
The shock had a maximum intensity of VII (Very strong). One person was killed in Tosagua. This was an aftershock of the 7.8 quake in April.
The shock had a maximum intensity of VIII (Severe).
Four people were killed and seven houses were destroyed. The shock had a maximum intensity of V (Moderate).
The shock had a maximum intensity of II (Weak). This was an foreshock of the 6.9 quake.
The shock had a maximum intensity of III (Weak).
The shock had a maximum intensity of VI (Strong).
The shock had a maximum intensity of VII (Very strong). Some houses and buildings collapsed in the region, and 28 people were injured, three of them seriously.
The shock had a maximum intensity of IV (Light).

June

The shock had a maximum intensity of VI (Strong). One person died of a heart attack during this earthquake, 18 were injured and more than 2,000 houses suffered damage.
The shock had a maximum intensity of III (Weak).
The shock had a maximum intensity of IV (Light).
The shock had a maximum intensity of IV (Light).
The shock had a maximum intensity of VI (Strong).
The shock had a maximum intensity of III (Weak).
The shock had a maximum intensity of VI (Strong). Some houses suffered damage in Chinandega, but no injuries were reported.
The shock had a maximum intensity of VI (Strong).
The shock had a maximum intensity of IV (Light).
The shock had a maximum intensity of V (Moderate).
The shock had a maximum intensity of IV (Light). This was an aftershock of the 6.3 quake.
The shock had a maximum intensity of I (Not felt).
The shock had a maximum intensity of III (Weak).
The shock had a maximum intensity of V (Moderate). Several houses were damaged in Kendawangan.
The shock had a maximum intensity of VII (Very strong).
The shock had a maximum intensity of V (Moderate).

July

The shock had a maximum intensity of VI (Strong). Dozens of homes collapsed in Rasht.
The shock had a maximum intensity of IV (Light). One person died when a boulder fell on him.
The shock had a maximum intensity of IV (Light).
The shock had a maximum intensity of VII (Very strong). Two people died during this earthquake.
The shock had a maximum intensity of III (Weak).
The shock had a maximum intensity of IV (Light).
The shock had a maximum intensity of V (Moderate).
The shock had a maximum intensity of IV (Light).
The shock had a maximum intensity of VI (Strong).
The shock had a maximum intensity of V (Moderate). Around 200 homes were damaged in Guangxi.
The shock had a maximum intensity of VI (Strong). A total of 147 buildings were damaged by the quake, 31 of them severely.

August

The shock had a maximum intensity of VII (Very strong). One man died of a heart attack in Parsabad, in the far northwest of Iran.
The shock had a maximum intensity of IV (Light).
The shock had a maximum intensity of II (Weak).
The shock had a maximum intensity of V (Moderate). Some damage occurred in Mariupol, like cracks on walls and plaster.
The shock had a maximum intensity of VI (Strong). Two people were injured, some buildings were damaged and landslides occurred in the Quito-Pichincha area.
The shock had a maximum intensity of IV (Light). Two people were injured and various buildings were damaged, some of them severely.
The shock had a maximum intensity of V (Moderate).
The shock had a maximum intensity of I (Not felt).
The shock had a maximum intensity of VI (Strong). The quake caused five deaths, including an American tourist, and injured at least 40 people.
The shock had a maximum intensity of VI (Strong). The quake, the highest magnitude to affect Queensland in 20 years, caused minor damage and briefly caused the evacuation of some airports.
The shock had a maximum intensity of I (Not felt).
The shock had a maximum intensity of III (Weak).
The shock had a maximum intensity of IV (Light).
The shock had a maximum intensity of I (Not felt). This was an aftershock of the 7.4 quake.
The shock had a maximum intensity of II (Weak).
The shock had a maximum intensity of VII (Very strong). 299 people of various nations were killed, 388 were injured, with heavy damage all around the epicenter, especially in Amatrice.
The shock had a maximum intensity of VI (Strong). Four people died, 20 were injured, and various stupas in Bagan were damaged.
 A magnitude 2.3 earthquake struck Poland on August 25 at a depth of 1 km (0.62 mi). Four people were injured due to a mine collapse, one of whom died in the hospital.
The shock had a maximum intensity of V (Moderate).
The shock had a maximum intensity of VII (Very strong). A total of 21 houses were damaged, 19 in San Lorenzo and two in Candelaria de la Frontera.
The shock had a maximum intensity of III (Weak).

September

The shock had a maximum intensity of VI (Strong).
The shock had a maximum intensity of IV (Light). This was an aftershock of the 7.0 quake.
The shock had a maximum intensity of VI (Strong). It is the strongest earthquake ever recorded within the state. One person was injured, and the earthquake caused moderate damage, especially in Pawnee where buildings were damaged.
The shock had a maximum intensity of V (Moderate). Six people were injured in nearby Quito during this earthquake, and some damage was caused.
The shock had a maximum intensity of III (Weak). Fifty-seven people were injured in a panicked evacuation of a school. Of those 57, three are reported to be in critical condition.
The shock had a maximum intensity of V (Moderate).
The shock had a maximum intensity of VII (Very strong).
The shock had a maximum intensity of IV (Light).
The shock had a maximum intensity of VI (Strong). Nineteen people were killed and 252 injured in Tanzania  as well as four people killed and seven injured in Uganda's Rakai District. Several houses collapsed in the Kangera regional capital of Bukoba and in Uganda.
The shock had a maximum intensity of VI (Strong). The quake caused minor damage to buildings and 30 people were injured while leaving their homes in a panic.
The shock had a maximum intensity of VII (Very strong). It is the strongest earthquake ever recorded in South Korea. Eight people were injured and 253 properties damaged.
The shock had a maximum intensity of VI (Strong).
The shock had a maximum intensity of V (Moderate).
The shock had a maximum intensity of IV (Light).
The shock had a maximum intensity of III (Weak).
The shock killed one person and left nine others injured in Hyderabad.
The shock had a maximum intensity of IV (Light).
The shock had a maximum intensity of VI (Strong). The quake killed 6 people and injured 5 others in the neighbouring Democratic Republic of the Congo. In Rwanda, this earthquake also killed one person, and injured more than 20 when various houses collapsed in Rusizi district.
The shock had a maximum intensity of V (Moderate). Two people were injured.
The shock had a maximum intensity of V (Moderate).
The shock had a maximum intensity of IV (Light).
The shock had a maximum intensity of III (Weak).
The shock had a maximum intensity of VI (Strong). One person died of a heart attack during this earthquake, five others were injured and some houses collapsed in La Paz Centro.

October

The shock had a maximum intensity of VI (Strong). Two people died and thirty others were injured.
The shock had a maximum intensity of III (Weak).
The shock had a maximum intensity of VI (Strong). The quake damaged some buildings in villages near Ioannina.
The shock had a maximum intensity of V (Moderate). One person died in Lambayeque when a floor lamp fell on her.
The shock had a maximum intensity of VI (Strong).
The shock had a maximum intensity of VI (Strong). One person died during this earthquake.
The shock had a maximum intensity of III (Weak).
The shock had a maximum intensity of II (Weak). Seven people were injured and some buildings suffered damage in Zarand.
The shock had a maximum intensity of VII (Very strong). At least 20 people were injured and some damage was caused.
The shock had a maximum intensity of V (Moderate). In the country's Western Province, at least three houses were destroyed and several others suffered damage. In the city of Bukavu, in the neighboring Democratic Republic of the Congo, two buildings were destroyed and others were damaged.
The shock had a maximum intensity of IV (Light).
The shock had a maximum intensity of VII (Very strong). Several buildings collapsed. Two people were injured. This was a foreshock of the 6.6 quake.
The shock had a maximum intensity of VII (Very strong). One person died of a heart attack during this earthquake and 8 others were injured when various houses collapsed in the region of Marche. This was a foreshock of the 6.6 quake.
The shock had a maximum intensity of IV (Light).
The shock had a maximum intensity of IV (Light). One person was injured and 15 houses were damaged by a rockslide in San Juan de Lurigancho.  
The shock had a maximum intensity of VIII (Severe). The villages of Arquata del Tronto, Visso, Castelsantangelo sul Nera, Ussita, as well as the Basilica of Saint Benedict in Norcia, were destroyed. Two people died of heart attacks during this earthquake and 20 others were injured.
The shock had a maximum intensity of VI (Strong). The widespread damage caused by the earthquake led to a declaration of public disaster by the Colombian government in northern Huila.

November

The shock had a maximum intensity of IV (Light).
The shock had a maximum intensity of VI (Strong).
The shock had a maximum intensity of VII (Very strong). Multiple buildings were damaged and minor injuries were reported.
The shock had a maximum intensity of VI (Strong).
The shock had a maximum intensity of V (Moderate).
The shock had a maximum intensity of IX (Violent). Ruptures occurred on multiple fault lines in a complex sequence that lasted for about two minutes with the largest amount of energy released far to the north of the epicentre. Two people were killed, and widespread damage was reported across parts of the South Island. A tsunami was also observed, reaching  at Kaikoura.
The shock had a maximum intensity of VII (Very strong). This was an aftershock of the 7.8 quake.
The shock had a maximum intensity of VI (Strong). This was an aftershock of the 7.8 quake.
The shock had a maximum intensity of VII (Very strong). This was an aftershock of the 7.8 quake.
The shock had a maximum intensity of VII (Very strong). This was an aftershock of the 7.8 quake.
The shock had a maximum intensity of VI (Strong). The quake, the strongest to affect the region in recent years, damaged various houses in San Juan province.
The shock had a maximum intensity of VI (Strong). 14 people were injured and more than 1,900 homes briefly lost electricity. A  tsunami wave was reported in the port of Onahama of Iwaki, Fukushima; a  wave hit Soma, Fukushima; and another wave  in height struck the Fukushima Daiichi Nuclear Power Plant site after the 6.9 shock. Chief Cabinet Secretary Yoshihide Suga said that the spent fuel cooling system of the third reactor at the neighboring Fukushima Daini Nuclear Power Plant had stopped as a result of the earthquake; TEPCO later reported the restart of the spent fuel cooling system after only 100 minutes of stoppage.
The shock had a maximum intensity of IV (Light). One person died of a heart attack due to shock and fear after hearing a tsunami warning alert.
The shock had a maximum intensity of VII (Very strong). One person died when various houses near the epicenter collapsed, and livestock were killed.
The shock had a maximum intensity of VI (Strong). This quake triggered an avalanche that killed one person and left another injured.
The shock had a maximum intensity of V (Moderate). This earthquake caused a mine collapse in Rudna, near the epicenter. Eight miners were killed and five others injured.

December

The shock had a maximum intensity of VI (Strong). The earthquake caused landslides and damaged some homes, forcing at least 5 families to move to a community centre.
The shock had a maximum intensity of VI (Strong). At least 40 houses in Lampa Province were damaged, with some suffering total collapse. One person died and 17 others were injured.
The shock had a maximum intensity of II (Weak).
The shock had a maximum intensity of VIII (Severe). About 245 buildings collapsed as a result of the quake. 104 people were killed and over 900 were injured, of which 136 suffered serious injuries.
The shock had a maximum intensity of VII (Very strong). Two people were injured, and 25 houses suffered damage in Ürümqi region.
The shock had a maximum intensity of IV (Light).
The shock had a maximum intensity of VIII (Severe). More than 200 buildings in the southern part of Malaita were damaged and buildings collapsed in Makira; more than 7,000 people were affected by the quake. An eleven-year-old girl died when a building collapsed.
The shock had a maximum intensity of V (Moderate). This was an aftershock of the 7.8 quake.
The shock had a maximum intensity of VI (Strong). The quake caused minor damage in the form of cracked walls and broken windows.
The shock had a maximum intensity of VI (Strong). This was an aftershock of the 7.8 quake.
The shock had a maximum intensity of IV (Light).
The shock had a maximum intensity of IV (Light).
The shock had a maximum intensity of VII (Very strong).
The shock had a maximum intensity of IV (Light). This was an aftershock of the 7.9 quake.
The shock had a maximum intensity of V (Moderate).
The shock had a maximum intensity of II (Weak).
The shock had a maximum intensity of VII (Very strong). This earthquake damaged houses, hotels, and caused some landslides in Atacames. Three people died and 47 others were injured.
The shock had a maximum intensity of VI (Strong). This was an aftershock of the 7.8 quake.
The shock had a maximum intensity of V (Moderate). This was an aftershock of the 7.8 quake.
The shock had a maximum intensity of V (Moderate).
The shock had a maximum intensity of IV (Light).
The shock had a maximum intensity of VIII (Severe). The quake ripped up a road near Lake Tarahuin. 4,000 people were evacuated in the Los Lagos area after a tsunami warning, but this alert was lifted one hour later.
The shock had a maximum intensity of V (Moderate). The quake caused minor damage to façades of some buildings, especially in Bucharest.
The shock had a maximum intensity of VII (Very strong). Two people were injured during this earthquake.
The shock had a maximum intensity of V (Moderate). One person died of a heart attack.

See also
 
 List of 20th-century earthquakes
 List of historical earthquakes
 Lists of earthquakes

References

External links
ShakeMap Background – United States Geological Survey

2016
 
2016 natural disasters
2016-related lists
2016